George Dunn may refer to:
 George H. Dunn (1794–1854), U.S. Representative from Indiana
 George G. Dunn (1812–1857), U.S. Representative from Indiana
 George Dunn (actor) (1914–1982), American actor
 George Dunn (publisher), American music publisher and lithographer
 George Dunn (Australian politician) (1859–1925), member of the South Australian House of Assembly
 Forrest Dunn (George Forrest Dunn, Jr., born 1928), American politician

See also
 George Dunne (1913–2006), politician from Illinois